Babruiyeh (also Romanized as Babrū’īyeh and Babru’iyeh; also known as Bahrūd, and Bīrū’īyeh) is a village in Banestan Rural District, in the Central District of Behabad County, Yazd Province, Iran. At the 2006 census, its population was 61, in 20 families.

References 

Populated places in Behabad County